The Cincinnati, Indianapolis and Western Railroad  was established in 1915 as a reorganization of the Cincinnati, Indianapolis and Western Railway, which in turn had been created in 1902 as a merger of the Indiana, Decatur and Western Railway (ID&W) and the Cincinnati, Hamilton and Indianapolis Railroad (CH&I). 

Predecessors of the ID&W include the Indianapolis, Decatur and Western Railway (1888–1894), the Indianapolis & Wabash Railway (1887–1888), the Indianapolis, Decatur and Springfield Railway (1875–1887), and the Indiana and Illinois Central Railway (1853–1875). Predecessors of the CH&I include the Junction Railroad (1848), the Cincinnati, Hamilton & Indianapolis, and the Cincinnati, Indianapolis & Western.

The CIWN's owned mainline was three segments connected and extended by trackage rights. The line was located in the states of Illinois, Indiana, and Ohio. The first segment extended from its trackage rights over the Chicago and Alton Railway in Springfield to Boody, Illinois. Trackage rights via the Wabash Railway connected Boody with Decatur, Illinois. The second segment ran from Decatur to Indianapolis, Indiana, where trackage rights over the Indianapolis Union Railway connected it with the third segment also located in Indianapolis. From there, the road extended to Hamilton, Ohio. Further trackage rights over the Toledo and Cincinnati Railroad extended the CIWN from Hamilton into Cincinnati, Ohio.

In 1927, it was acquired by the Baltimore and Ohio Railroad.

References

Former Class I railroads in the United States
Defunct Illinois railroads
Defunct Indiana railroads
Defunct Ohio railroads
Predecessors of the Baltimore and Ohio Railroad
Railway companies established in 1915
Railway companies disestablished in 1990
American companies established in 1915